Afro-Colombians or African-Colombians are Colombians of full or partial sub-Saharan African descent (blacks, mulattoes, pardos, and zambos).

History

Africans were enslaved in the early 16th century in Colombia. They were from various places across the continent, including: modern-day Congo, Angola, Gambia, Liberia, Ghana, Ivory Coast, Guinea-Bissau, Sierra Leone, Senegal, and Mali. They were forcibly taken to Colombia to replace the Indigenous population, which was rapidly decreasing due to colonialism and genocide.

Enslaved African people were forced to work in gold mines, on sugarcane plantations, cattle ranches, and large haciendas.  African slaves pioneered the extraction of alluvial gold deposits and the growing of sugar cane in the areas that are known in modern times as the departments of Chocó, Antioquia, Cauca, Valle del Cauca, and Nariño in western Colombia.

The UNODOC reported 66% of the alluvial gold is illegally mined, with 42% of these illegal activities directly affecting Afro-Colombian communities.

In eastern Colombia, near the cities of Vélez, Cúcuta, Socorro and Tunja, Africans manufactured textiles in commercial mills. Emerald mines outside of Bogotá relied on African labourers. Other sectors of the Colombian economy, like tobacco, cotton, artisanship and domestic work would have been impossible without African labor. In pre-abolition Colombian society, many Afro-Colombian captives fought the Spanish, their colonial forces and their freedom as soon as they arrived in Colombia. Those who escaped from their oppressors would live in free Black African towns called Palenques, where they would live as "Cimarrones", or fugitives. Some historians considered Chocó to be a very big palenque, with a large population of Cimarrones, especially in the areas of the Baudó River. This is where Cimarrón leaders like Benkos Biohó and Barule fought for freedom.

African people played key roles in the struggle for independence from the Spanish Crown. Historians note that three of every five soldiers in Simón Bolívar's army were African. Afro-Colombians were able to participate at all levels of military and political life.

In 1851, after the abolition of slavery, the plight of Afro-Colombians was very difficult. They were forced to live in the jungles for self-protection. There they learned to have a harmonious relationship with the jungle environment and share the territory with Colombia's indigenous people.

Beginning in 1851, the Colombian State promoted mestizaje or miscegenation. In order to maintain their cultural traditions, many Africans and indigenous peoples went deep into isolated jungles. Afro-Colombians and indigenous people were often targeted by armed groups who wanted to displace them in order to take their land for sugar cane plantations, coffee and banana plantations, mining and wood exploitation. This form of discrimination still occurs today.

In 1945, the department of El Chocó was created, the first predominantly African political-administrative division in the country. El Chocó provided the possibility of building an African territorial identity and some autonomous decision-making power.

Demographics

In the 1970s, there was a major influx of Afro-Colombians into urban areas in search of greater economic and social opportunities for their children. This led to an increase in the number of urban poor in the marginal areas of big cities like Cali, Medellín, and Bogotá. Most Afro-Colombians are currently living in urban areas. Only around 25%, or 1.2 million people, are based in rural areas, compared to 75%, or 3.7 million people, in urban zones. The 1991 Colombian Constitution gave them the right to collective ownership of traditional Pacific coastal lands and special cultural development protections.  Critics argue that this important legal instrument is not enough to address their social and developmental needs completely.

Afro-Colombians  are concentrated on the northwest Caribbean coast and the Pacific coast in such departments as Chocó, whose capital, Quibdó, is 95.3% Afro-Colombian as opposed to just 2.3% mestizo or white. Similar numbers are found in Buenaventura where over 80% of the population is Afro-Colombian. Considerable numbers are also in Cali, Cartagena and Barranquilla. Colombia is considered to have the fourth largest Black/African-descent population in the western hemisphere, following United States, Brazil, and Haiti.

It has been estimated that only 4.4 million Afro-Colombians actively recognize their black ancestry, while many other African Colombians do not as a result of inter-racial relations with white and indigenous Colombians. Afro-Colombians often encounter a noticeable degree of racial discrimination and prejudice, possibly as a socio-cultural leftover from colonial times. They have been historically absent from high-level government positions and many of their long-established settlements around the Pacific coast remain underdeveloped.

In Colombia's ongoing internal conflict, Afro-Colombians are both victims of violence and displacement as well as members of armed factions, such as the FARC and the AUC.

African Colombians have played a role in contributing to the development of certain aspects of Colombian culture. For example, several of Colombia's musical genres, such as Cumbia and Vallenato, have African origins or influences. Some African Colombians have also been successful in sports, such as Olympic weightlifter Óscar Figueroa and footballer, Patrocinio Bonilla, also known as "Patrón" (believed to have been murdered on August 11, 2020).

Cultural contribution

Music 

In Colombia, native songs and musical genres are characterized by an exchange of multiple energetic and progressive musical processes. Notable examples include bambuco, cumbia, and porro, which are examples of typical folkloric musical genres that can be traced to having an African origin, descent, or influence in style.

Bambuco 
The Bambuco has a unique indigenous origin, but is also composed of a multicultural tradition. The Bambuco is established in Colombia's central Andean and Cauca area and is played by string ensembles. It can be portrayed in different instrumental variants such as the Bambuco fiestero (a faster more playful rhythm) or the contemporary Bambuco.

It is believed that the Bambuco is a musical genre that inevitability was brought by the Africans when the first slaves arrived at Cauca region. There is also a relationship between Bambuco and the name of a town in French Sudan "Bambuk," and it has been theorized that this genre comes from that specific region. Another piece of evidence is the syncopation and other forms of rhythms within the same piece of music. African music utilizes syncopated rhythms just like Bambuco does. Others theorized different appearances of Bambuco in different locations of the country, but they all coincide in an African origin or inspiration for the formation of this musical genre. For instance, on the western side of what is now Mali, a century ago, a nation named "Bambouk" existed  and potentially the name of bambuco was derived from this nation in Mali. In a country at the horn of Africa in Eritrea, there is a town called Bambuco. In Angola, there is a town called Bambuca and very close to that town there is another one called Cauca. Like mentioned above, the Cauca department is argued to be the place where the Bambuco genre emerged.

A different branch of bambuco emerged in the Pacific Coast of Colombia, the contemporary Bambuco. The pacific coast and the northern coast of Colombia have an Afro-Colombian population that surpasses the average in comparison to any other region in the country (90% and 50%, respectively). In the region of Cauca at the coast and in between the Magdalena River, the most traditional black population is settled. Many slaves came in through the Cauca River or the Magdalena River, if they were to have come from the northern side of the country. On the other hand, the argument that the Bambuco evolved in the Pacific is supported by the biggest population of Afro-Colombians in the country residing in the department of Choco, on the Pacific coast. The Pacific coast is the only place in the country where the absolute majority is of African descent. The reason for the Pacific coast's vast majority Afro-Colombian population is not only due to its location and the rapid entrance of transportation of boats and slaves during colonization, but also due to emancipation around the year 1815. The act of emancipation led for the Pacific coast to become a refugee zone and develop into a safer place for slaves from the Choco area as well as those from the interior of the country and other urban sites throughout the country. This allowed for the Afro-Colombian population to grow in this region of the country and therefore develop within certain cultural characteristics such musical genres of African descent but are born or popularized in Colombia. With this evidence, although the Bambuco is not originally from Colombia, it became a national identity for many due to its multicultural composition. It has since spread from west to north in the country.

Cumbia 
The cumbia is another typical Colombian musical genre that emerged from the African slaves in Colombia. In this case, cumbia is a mixture of rhythms from Afro-Colombians and indigenous native Colombiansto bring about a different style. Unlike the Bambuco, cumbia certainly originated in the northern part of Colombia, and its instrumentation is the key evidence of its origin, as well as its dances.This dance has become the most influential in Latin America.     Particular to cumbia, a typical Spanish dress was adapted to available native resources. In the present day, it is culturally significant enough to know about cumbia, and it is a concern to preserve it. The main festival that celebrates cumbia nowadays is the Festival de la Cumbia in El Banco, Magdalena. In order to preserve this folkloric rhythm, this genre is celebrated yearly in the Colombian Caribbean region.

Champeta 
Throughout the years, the African heritage in music has been evolving from bambuco to porro to cumbia to champeta. Champeta is the more modern rhythm inspired by African culture and music style. The Champeta is born through a blend of African and Caribbean rhythms, including the cumbia. The name champeta is derived by a form of Bowie knife that only low income, rural workers, usually people of African descent, would use due to their low socioeconomic status. These Bowie knives are used to cut the grass, and keep yards or streets clean, and therefore this musical genre is associated with a status and also race. This genre is native to the northern coast and experimentation with many new rhythms is common. Thus a lot of commerce emerged around these varying new rhythms and much more music has become available from the African continent. This is another example of the multicultural composition of musical genres due to the diaspora throughout the country of Colombia.

Current issues faced by Afro-Colombians 
Ever since Afro-Colombians arrived in Colombia in the first decade of the 16th century, they have been considered a minority group by the Colombian government, exposing them to discrimination and inequality. Many advocacy groups, including the National Association of Displaced Afro-Colombians (AFRODES) or Chao Racismo, as well as various Afro-Colombian activists, have come together to fight for this ethnic group's rights. However, Afro-Colombians continue to protest for their rights and demand equality between themselves and all non-Afro Colombians in certain social aspects. Social issues concerning Afro-Colombians range from socio-economic inequalities to physical violence and other forms of inequality and discrimination in Colombia.

Educational disparities in Afro-Colombian life
There is an acknowledgment of a racist undertone in Colombia. There is a lack of implementing the history of Afro-Colombian culture, language, and overall visibility within Colombian educational hubs. Even so, their history is not told correctly to the Colombian people. It is recorded that the African slaves that entered throughout the 15th to 18th century were not given their freedom by the republic but by their own accord. During religious festivals and other days, slaves were permitted to work for their profit. Then, they would save up their money to buy their freedom. This marked the beginning of Afro-Colombians and their relationship with Colombia. 
In 2007, the Colombian national government implemented a new section in the government for Afro-Colombians called "la Comisión Intersectorial para el Avance de la Población Afrocolombiana, Palenquera y Raizal." This sector was intended for the advancement of the education of Afro-Colombians. Not only this but the Colombian government had also conducted specialized studies and 18 workshops across the cities of Colombia. Due to this, about 4000 Afro-Colombian community leaders came together to write recommendations to the government by May 2009. However, after many years, none of the strategies have worked and Afro-Colombians still lack the same opportunities as their whiter Colombian counterparts. The Colombian government has tried to help the Afro-Colombian people by creating more programs to further the education of Afro-Colombians past high school. The main program is the "Admisión Especial a Mejores Bachilleres de la Población Negra, Afrocolombiana, Palenquera y Raizal" which gives admission to about 200 Afro-Colombians per semester into the National Colombian University. This program can be compared to affirmative action in the United States, once again highlighting the imbalance of opportunities for Afro-Colombians. 
The Ministry of Education has attempted to make recommendations on the subject of the background and history of Afro-Colombians when teaching Colombian history. In hopes of incorporating more Afro-Colombian history, the ministry of education plans to add Afro-Colombian history on exams of the state.

Socio-economic inequalities 
Afro-Colombians are a significant portion (almost one quarter) of Colombia's overall population, yet they are one of the poorest ethnic groups of the country. More specifically, studies have shown that three-quarters of the Colombian population which is classified as being "poor", is composed of Afro-Colombians. This is reflected in some of the most basic, daily, aspects of their lives, such as the average annual salary of Afro-Colombians. While people from this ethnic group earn, on average, 500 dollars a year (or 1.5 million Colombian pesos) people that are from White or Mestizo ethnic groups earn an average of 1500 dollars a year (or 4.5 million Colombian Pesos). This means that the average Afro-Colombian earns three times less than the average White/Mestizo Colombian.

This is a result of the inequality present in the Colombian education system. The quality of education afforded to the black population pales in comparison to that of the white/mestizo population. The black population is also not granted the same opportunities when it come to jobs or social advancement. These are the factors that contribute to an 80 percent rate of poverty among African descendants. The World Bank recently reported that the percentage of Afro-Colombians that receive primary education is higher than the percentage of primary education received by the rest of Colombians, being 42% versus 32%, respectively. However, many Afro-Colombians are not able to receive any higher education besides primary level education because secondary education (or high school education) is only offered to 62% of Afro-Colombians, while this type of education is offered to 75% of all other Colombians. Furthermore, researchers have found that the overall educational quality of schools located in Afro-Colombian communities is much lower and poorer than those in other communities, mainly because of the lack of government support and investment in these areas. This was reflected in the results of the ICFES exam (national standardized exam), which showed that the average results for Afro-Colombians were significantly lower than the results of the rest of Colombians. Given that only a very few numbers of Afro-Colombians can reach college/university education, the range of jobs for most Afro-Colombians is very limited and obtaining high-level jobs with a good salary is very difficult for them to achieve.

White Colombians in Bogota strengthen already existing racial ladders and reinforce them in urban areas through spatial isolation—placing racism and racial discrimination external to their social worlds. Discrimination based on race and spatial isolation affects the interaction between citizens in urban spaces.

Urban researchers have found drastic economic differences between the residents of Bogota. Suburbs are segregated and more uniform with people with similar incomes. This stratification has a racial and economic element to it. Afro-Colombians are segregated and live in all 19 sectors of the city, which are sectors with the two lowest stratum classification such as designations, Bosa, Kennedy, and Ciudad Bolivar, which are situated very far away from Zona Rosa, a city full of nightlife and entertainment.

Statistics on jobs and politics 
According to a study, between 2002 and 2010 Afro-Colombian legislators proposed 25 bills directly affecting the Afro-Colombian community and only two bills were approved.

Another study done by the National Union School found that 65% of Afro-Colombians in the informal sector and 29% in the formal sector make less than the minimum wage.

Example of social inequality 
The racism in Colombia is so extreme that it can get Afro-Colombians stopped for just looking suspicious. It maximizes where they can go and where they cannot. For instance, Afro-Colombians are prevented from getting into some nightclubs and restaurants. They are denied entrance to certain places where many elites and tourists usually go. People have been moved aside and questioned because of their skin color, while other people can get in without further questioning. Bouncers usually tell them that they are hosting a private party and they need invitations to get in. They use this as an excuse to stop them from entering these places.

The television comedy Sábados Felices includes a blackface character.

Effects of the war on Afro-Colombians 
Colombia's civil war began in the year 1964 and finished in the year 2017, when a peace treaty between the guerrilla movement (FARC) and the government was concreted and signed. This long civil war affected and continues to affect most Colombians, however, according to the World Directory of Minorities and Indigenous People (WDMIP), some particular communities have been significantly more affected than others. One of these, says WDMIP, are Afro-Colombian communities, who have been strongly impacted by the civil war, mainly because of their vulnerability and lack of protection from the government. For years, the FARC guerrilla has sought areas to invade and gain possession of as many Colombian territories as they can. Territories that are occupied by minority groups such as indigenous groups and Afro-Colombians are typically the poorest and therefore seen as the easiest areas to invade. Many Afro-Colombian regions have been "attacked" and taken over by the FARC, which has resulted in more than 2 million Afro-Colombians being displaced. Most of them have been forced to migrate towards bigger cities (like Bogotá, Cali, or Medellín), which has increased their level of poverty (due to the higher cost of living in such urban areas), as well as their exposure to discrimination and violence. Even though the occurrences of these scenarios has significantly decreased since the peace treaty was signed last year, the people who were displaced continue to be affected by this situation and struggle to go back to their hometowns.

On another hand, the civil war has made Afro-Colombians victims of violence because Afro-Colombian territories, such as El Chocó, have become the combat zone between the FARC guerrilla and the Colombian government. More specifically, this means that they have been exposed to bombs, shootings, and deaths at a much higher level than all other Colombians. Because of this, many Afro-Colombians have been victims of collateral damage and have been killed due to this war, which has become another major reason for displacement to occur. According to research done by one of Colombia's official radio stations called Caracol Radio, over 25% of Afro-Colombians have left their hometown due to violence.

Finally, another conflict that has been generated by the civil war is that of drug trafficking and prostitution. For years, the FARC guerrilla was seeking to recruit people that would do this for them at a low cost. Given that a high percentage of Afro-Colombians are extremely poor, young people from these communities are tempted by these options because they see them as the only way out to combat the poverty in which they live. As a result, over 40% of the people in the guerrilla group is composed of Afro-Colombians who now support the conflict and have been manipulated to continue supporting that side of the conflict.

Health disparities 
A recent study conducted by the London School of Economics revealed that Afro-Colombians are at an extreme disadvantage in terms of being healthy when compared to the rest of the Colombian population. Furthermore, this study showed that many socioeconomic factors are involved in this and that contribute to such disparities. For example, the fact that Afro-Colombians are much poorer than the rest of the Colombian population is one of the main reasons that they are in a position of disadvantage when it comes to seeking health care services and being healthy in general. This is supported by their findings that showed that just under 5% of Afro-Colombians have medical insurance, compared to almost 30% of all non-Afro Colombians. Additionally, they found that most Afro-Colombians live in unsanitary conditions that increase exposure to a large variety of diseases as well as a common trend among Afro-Colombian children with bad health. This is often due to uneducated mothers.

Health inequality has negatively affected many minorities in Colombia; particularly those from a very low socioeconomic status such as Afro-Colombians. In comparison with the indigenous populations in Colombia, Afro-Colombians are at a greater disadvantage when it comes to access to health care. Research from 2003 shows that 53.8% of black people did not have access to health insurance compared to 37.9% of the indigenous population. Only 10.64% of Afro-Colombians were affiliated to the subsidised regime in comparison with most of the indigenous population. Moreover, 65.8% vs. 74.6% of non-minorities groups characterized their health status as very good and good while 30.7% vs. 22.7% of indigenous and Afro-Colombians described it as fair and 3.5% vs. 2.8% as poor. This reveals the health disparities among minority groups in Colombia in comparison with the rest of the population.

Researchers have found that the adult Afro-Colombian population is less likely to be described as being in good health compared to the rest of the population. They are also more likely to report that they are sick and are dealing with chronic issues. This population is also less likely to obtain treatment if they are sick. Nevertheless, when they do look for medical treatment, they tend to receive it in the same numbers as non-Afro-Colombians. These results are not just explained by disadvantages in socioeconomic status, health insurances, or educational level, but by the discrimination that Afro-Colombians experience in their daily lives. Even when health insurance is given for free, Afro-Colombians are far less likely to be enrolled and this can be explained by structural and internalized discrimination.

Raizales

The Raizal ethnic group is an Afro-Caribbean group living in Archipelago of San Andrés, Providencia, and Santa Catalina, speaking the San Andrés-Providencia Creole.

Notable Afro-Colombians

 Alexander Mejía
 Angelo Balanta
 Danovis Banguero
 Dorlan Pabon
 Eliécer Espinosa
 Jaminton Campaz
 Jherson Vergara
 Jhon Mosquera
 Justin Arboleda
 Agustín Julio
 Aquivaldo Mosquera
 Andrés Colorado
 Andres Reyes
 Antonio Cervantes, professional boxer  from San Basilio de Palenque
 Carlos Carbonero
 Cristhian Mosquera
 David Ferreira
 Diego Valoyes
 Eddie Salcedo
 Hugo Rodallega
 Francia Márquez, Vice President of Colombia
 Jader Valencia
 Jeison Murillo
Jefferson Lerma
 Jonathan Copete
 Jorge Segura
 Jhon Vásquez
Juan José Nieto Gil, first and only President of the Republic with known Afro-Colombian ancestry
Luis Antonio Robles Suárez, first Afro-Colombian lawyer and politician
Joe Arroyo, Salsa singer, songwriter, and composer
Benkos Biohó, founder of San Basilio de Palenque
Caterine Ibargüen, athlete
Faustino Asprilla, footballer
 Felipe Pardo
 Frank Fabra
Adassa - Singer and actress
Éder Álvarez Balanta, footballer
Vanessa Mendoza, Miss Colombia 2001 winner and fashion model
Piedad Córdoba, politician
ChocQuibTown, Afro-Colombian hip-hop group.
Juan Cuadrado, footballer
Cristián Zapata, footballer 
Raul Cuero, scientist
Alfredo Morelos, footballer
Jackson Martínez, footballer
 Robinson Zapata
Yerry Mina, footballer
Luis Alberto Moore, police brigadier-general 
Alfonso Múnera Cavadía, diplomat and historian 
Nixon Perea, footballer
Andrés Perea, American soccer player for Orlando City SC and son of Nixon Perea
Luis Amaranto Perea, footballer
Luis Gilberto Murillo, politician
Manuel Zapata Olivella, writer
Breidis Prescott, professional boxer
Édgar Rentería, Major League Baseball player
Freddy Rincón, footballer
 Carlos Sánchez
Davinson Sánchez, footballer
María Isabel Urrutia, first Olympic gold medal winner for the country
Óscar Figueroa, weightlifter
Carlos Valderrama, footballer
Jealisse Andrea Tovar Velásquez, Miss Colombia 2015 winner and fashion model
Valeria Ayos, Miss Universe Colombia 2021 winner 
Paula Marcela Moreno Zapata, politician
 Adrián Ramos
Antumi Toasijé, historian and activist
 Cucho Hernández
Candelario Obeso, Afro-Colombian author, journalist, engineer
Duván Zapata, footballer
Diego Salazar weightlifter and Olympic medalist
Ilia Calderón, journalist
 Brayan Angulo
 Brayan Moreno
 Carlos Cuesta
 Diego Chará
 Luis Sinisterra
 Victor Ibarbo
 Víctor Montaño
 Wbeymar Angulo
 Yimmi Chará
 Jordy Monroy
 Harold Preciado
 Humberto Osorio
 Mauricio Cuero
 Macnelly Torres
 Mikkel Mena Qvist
 Yerson Mosquera
 Didier Moreno
 Orlando Berrío
 Rene Higuita
 Vicente Besuijen
 Wason Rentería
 Wilmar Barrios
 Wilmer Valderrama
 Jhon Lucumí
 Lucho
 Luis Muriel
 Pedro Portocarrero
 Stiven Mendoza
 Mateo Cassierra
 Walter Moreno
 William Tesillo
 Yairo Moreno
 Farid Díaz
 Marlos Moreno
 Miguel Borja
 Sebastian Villa
 Yony González
 Jhon Arias
 Jimmy Valoyes
 Yesus Cabrera

See also

 Afro-American peoples of the Americas
 Afro-Latin Americans
 Race and ethnicity in Colombia
 Mestizo Colombians
 White Colombians
 Arab Colombians
 Indigenous peoples in Colombia

References

External links

>
AfroColombiany.org Afro-Colombian News in English.
CNN video of Afro-Colombian community
Colombian 2005 Census Television Commercial  Orgullosamente Afrocolombiano
 The World Bank's Sector Report "The Gap Matters: poverty and well-being of Afro-Colombians and indigenous peoples" Click here for the report
African-Diasporic Regions of Colombia plus more COLOMBIAFRICA
Documentary 150 years after abolition Libertad En Colombia (Liberty In Colombia)
Colombia contra el racismo
  "Law 70: English Translation of Ley 70"

 
Society of Colombia
-